The 1570 siege of Hanazawa was one of several battles fought between the Takeda and Imagawa clans during the Takeda's campaign to seize Suruga province, during Japan's Sengoku period.

Hanazawa castle was under the command of Imagawa general Ōhara Sukenaga. Nagasaka Tsuruyasu, Hajikano Saemon, and Takeda Shingen himself led the siege, which was successful in taking the castle after four days.

References
Turnbull, Stephen (1998). 'The Samurai Sourcebook'. London: Cassell & Co.

1570 in Japan
Hanazawa 1570
Conflicts in 1570
Hanazawa 1570
 Hanazawa